

World Domination Enterprises was an English post-punk band active in the mid/late 1980s. Fronted by former Here & Now drummer Dobson, the band's dissonant sound mixed elements of punk, noise, dub, hip hop, and rockabilly. They were best known for their cover version of LL Cool Js "I Can't Live Without My Radio", and first single "Asbestos Lead Asbestos". The latter song was later referenced in the 1990 Carter USM single "Rubbish", and covered by Meat Beat Manifesto on their 1996 Subliminal Sandwich album.

Their debut album Let's Play Domination was released in 1988. The band was linked with the Mutoid Waste Company, and played at many of their events, as well as CND benefits. Much of their back catalogue was compiled on the 2009 reissue of Let's Play Domination.

Selected discography
Chart placings shown are from the UK Indie Chart.

Albums
Let's Play Domination (1988)
Love From Lead City (1988)

Singles
"Asbestos Lead Asbestos" (1985)
"Catalogue Clothes" (1986) (#24)
"Hotsy Girl" (1987) (#15)
"I Can't Live Without My Radio" (1988) (#8)
"The Company News" (1989)

References

External links
Full discography
2009 retrospective interview at The Quietus

English indie rock groups
English post-punk music groups